Aleh Astrashapkin (born 20 January 1992) is a Belarusian handball player who plays for Hapoel Rishon LeZion and for the Belarusian national team.

References

1992 births
Living people
Belarusian male handball players
People from Mogilev
Expatriate handball players
Belarusian expatriate sportspeople in Hungary
Sportspeople from Mogilev Region